Guy Forget and Yannick Noah were the defending champions, but Noah did not compete this year. Forget teamed up with Pat Cash and lost in the quarterfinals to Jorge Lozano and Todd Witsken.

Lozano and Witsken won the title by defeating Anders Järryd and Tomáš Šmíd 6–3, 6–3 in the final.

Seeds

Draw

Finals

Top half

Bottom half

References

External links
 Official results archive (ATP)
 Official results archive (ITF)

Men's Doubles